Stéphanie Weber Biron (born May 21, 1976) is a Canadian cinematographer. She is a three-time Genie and Canadian Screen Award nominee, receiving nods for Best Cinematography at the 31st Genie Awards in 2011 for her work on Heartbeats (Les Amours imaginaires) and at the 9th Canadian Screen Awards in 2021 for her work on Nadia, Butterfly, and for Best Cinematography in a Documentary at the 8th Canadian Screen Awards in 2020 for City Dreamers.

References

External links

1976 births
Canadian cinematographers
Canadian women cinematographers
French Quebecers
People from Montreal
Living people